Lokot is a rural locality (a selo) and the administrative center of Loktevsky Selsoviet of Loktevsky District, Altai Krai, Russia. The population was 1,066 as of 2016. There are  14 streets.

Geography 
Novomikhaylovka is the nearest rural locality.

References 

Rural localities in Loktevsky District